The 2008–09 season was Sloboda's seventh consecutive season in Serbian League West.

Fixtures

League table

References

FK Sloboda Užice
Sloboda Uzice